Witchy PreCure! is the thirteenth anime television series in Izumi Todo's Pretty Cure franchise, produced by Asahi Broadcasting Corporation and Toei Animation. The series follows a girl named Mirai Asahina and a magician named Riko Izayoi, who both attend Magic School whilst also becoming the Witchy Precure Pretty Cure to fight off the evil Dokuroxy. The series aired on ABC in Japan between February 7, 2016 and January 29, 2017, replacing Go! Princess PreCure in its initial timeslot and was succeeded by Kirakira PreCure a la Mode.


Episode list

See also
Witchy Precure! the Movie: The Miraculous Transformation! Cure Mofurun! - An animated film based on the series.
Pretty Cure All Stars: Singing with Everyone♪ Miraculous Magic! - The eighth and final Pretty Cure All Stars crossover film, which stars the Witchy Precure PreCure.

References

Pretty Cure episode lists